"Unconditional" was the third single by American rock band the Bravery from their self-titled debut album (2005). It was released in the United Kingdom on 29 August 2005 and charted at number 49 on the UK Singles Chart.

Track listings
 7-inch (9884838)
 "Unconditional"
 "An Honest Mistake" (acoustic)
 Recorded for Jo Whiley's Live Lounge.

 CD (9885196)
 "Unconditional"
 "Unconditional" (Benny Benassi mix)

 Maxi-CD (9885197)
 "Unconditional"
 "Oh Glory"
 "An Honest Mistake" (Superdiscount mix)
 "Unconditional" (video)

References

External links
 The Bravery
 The Bravery Forum

2005 singles
2005 songs
The Bravery songs
Polydor Records singles
Songs written by Sam Endicott